Louis Sauthier (born 1902, date of death unknown) was a Swiss boxer. He competed in the men's welterweight event at the 1924 Summer Olympics. At the 1924 Summer Olympics, he lost to Jean Delarge of Belgium.

References

External links
 

1902 births
Year of death missing
Swiss male boxers
Olympic boxers of Switzerland
Boxers at the 1924 Summer Olympics
Place of birth missing
Welterweight boxers